The Ministry of National Security (MONS), officially titled the Ministry of National Security, Public Administration, Home Affairs, Information & Communications Technology, is the interior ministry of the government of Grenada. Its headquarters are in St. George's, the capital city of Grenada.

, the Minister for National Security, Public Administration, Home Affairs, Information & Communications Technology is Keith Mitchell, the Prime Minister of Grenada.

References

External links 
 

Government of Grenada